The 8th Central Military Commission of the Workers' Party of Korea (WPK) (제 8차 조선로동당 중앙 군사위원회), officially the Central Military Commission of the 8th Central Committee of the Workers' Party of Korea, was elected at the 1st Plenary Session of the 7th WPK Central Committee in the immediate aftermath of the party's 8th Congress on 10 January 2021. It is composed of one chairman, one vice chairmen and eleven ordinary members.

Meetings

Officers

Members

References

8th Central Military Commission of the Workers' Party of Korea